Chris Brown is a Missouri politician serving as a member of the Missouri House of Representatives from the 16th district since 2021. He succeeded fellow Republican Noel Shull.

Missouri House of Representatives

Committee assignments 

 General Laws
 Workforce Development
 Special Committee on Small Business 
Source:

Electoral history

References 

Republican Party members of the Missouri House of Representatives
Living people
21st-century American politicians
Year of birth missing (living people)